An oropharyngeal airway (also known as an oral airway, OPA or Guedel pattern airway) is a medical device called an airway adjunct used in airway management to maintain or open a patient's airway. It does this by preventing the tongue from covering the epiglottis, which could prevent the person from breathing.  When a person becomes unconscious, the muscles in their jaw relax and allow the tongue to obstruct the airway.

History and usage
The oropharyngeal airway was designed by Arthur Guedel.

Oropharyngeal airways come in a variety of sizes, from infant to adult, and are used commonly in pre-hospital emergency care and for short term airway management post anaesthetic or when manual methods are inadequate to maintain an open airway.  This piece of equipment is utilized by certified first responders, emergency medical technicians, paramedics and other health professionals when tracheal intubation is either not available, not advisable or the problem is of short term duration.

Oropharyngeal airways are indicated only in unconscious people, because of the likelihood that the device would stimulate a gag reflex in conscious or semi-conscious persons. This could result in vomit and potentially lead to an obstructed airway. Nasopharyngeal airways are mostly used instead as they do not stimulate a gag reflex.

In general, oropharyngeal airways need to be sized and inserted correctly to maximize effectiveness and minimize possible complications, such as oral trauma.

Insertion

The correct size OPA is chosen by measuring from the first incisors to the angle of the jaw. The airway is then inserted into the person's mouth upside down. Once contact is made with the back of the throat, the airway is rotated 180 degrees, allowing for easy insertion, and assuring that the tongue is secured. An alternative method for insertion, the method that is recommended for OPA use in children and infants, involves holding the tongue forward with a tongue depressor and inserting the airway right side up.

The device is removed when the person regains swallow reflex and can protect their own airway, or it is substituted for an advanced airway. It is removed simply by pulling on it without rotation.

Usage
Use of an OPA does not remove the need for the recovery position and ongoing assessment of the airway and it does not prevent obstruction by liquids (blood, saliva, food, cerebrospinal fluid) or the closing of the glottis. It can, however, facilitate ventilation during CPR (cardiopulmonary resuscitation) and for persons with a large tongue.

Key risks of use
The main risks of its use are:
 if the person has a gag reflex, they may vomit
 when it is too large, it can close the glottis and thus close the airway
 improper sizing can cause bleeding in the airway

See also
 Airway management
 Bag valve mask
 Guedel's classification of stages of anesthesia
 Endotracheal tube
 Laryngeal mask airway
 Nasopharyngeal airway

References

External links 

 ISO 5364:2016 Anaesthetic and respiratory equipment — Oropharyngeal airways

Airway management
First aid
Emergency medicine